"True Believer" is a song written by E-Type and Savan Kotecha, and recorded by E-Type on the album Eurotopia. It was originally played over radio on 11 May 2007 at the RIX Morronzoo programme. As a newcomer it directly entered 5th position at Trackslistan at Sveriges Radio P3. On 24 May 2007 it entered the first position at the Swedish singles chart, a position it held for one week. In Finland, it peaked at No. 3 in the Finnish singles chart

On 10 June 2007, it received a Svensktoppen test, but failed to enter chart.

In August 2007, it was certified gold in Sweden.

Chart positions

References

2007 songs
2007 singles
E-Type (musician) songs
Songs written by Savan Kotecha
Number-one singles in Sweden